Elections to Cookstown District Council were held on 20 May 1981 on the same day as the other Northern Irish local government elections. The election used three district electoral areas to elect a total of 15 councillors.

Election results

Note: "Votes" are the first preference votes.

Districts summary

|- class="unsortable" align="centre"
!rowspan=2 align="left"|Ward
! % 
!Cllrs
! % 
!Cllrs
! %
!Cllrs
! %
!Cllrs
! % 
!Cllrs
!rowspan=2|TotalCllrs
|- class="unsortable" align="center"
!colspan=2 bgcolor="" | SDLP
!colspan=2 bgcolor="" | UUP
!colspan=2 bgcolor="" | DUP
!colspan=2 bgcolor="" | UUUP
!colspan=2 bgcolor="white"| Others
|-
|align="left"|Area A
|bgcolor="#99FF66"|25.8
|bgcolor="#99FF66"|1
|21.5
|1
|21.8
|1
|9.4
|1
|21.5
|1
|5
|-
|align="left"|Area B
|bgcolor="#99FF66"|28.2
|bgcolor="#99FF66"|2
|22.6
|2
|23.5
|1
|0.0
|0
|25.7
|1
|6
|-
|align="left"|Area C
|bgcolor="#99FF66"|41.4
|bgcolor="#99FF66"|2
|30.7
|1
|27.9
|1
|0.0
|0
|0.0
|0
|4
|- class="unsortable" class="sortbottom" style="background:#C9C9C9"
|align="left"| Total
|31.4
|5
|24.7
|4
|24.3
|3
|2.9
|3
|16.7
|2
|15
|-
|}

Districts results

Area A

1977: 1 x SDLP, 1 x DUP, 1 x UUP, 1 x UUUP, 1 x Independent Nationalist
1981: 1 x SDLP, 1 x DUP, 1 x UUP, 1 x UUUP, 1 x Independent Nationalist
1977-1981 Change: No change

Area B

1977: 2 x SDLP, 2 x UUUP, 1 x UUP, 1 x Independent Republican
1981: 2 x SDLP, 2 x UUP, 1 x DUP, 1 x Independent Republican
1977-1981 Change: UUP and DUP gain from UUUP (two seats)

Area C

1977: 2 x SDLP, 2 x UUP
1981: 2 x SDLP, 1 x UUP, 1 x DUP
1977-1981 Change: DUP gain from UUP

References

Cookstown District Council elections
Cookstown